Yuraktau (Yäräktaw) is a rural locality (a village) in Karansky Selsoviet, Buzdyaksky District, Bashkortostan, Russia. The population was 28 as of 2010. There is 1 street.

Geography 
Yuraktau is located 19 km northeast of Buzdyak (the district's administrative centre) by road. Amirovo is the nearest rural locality.

References 

Rural localities in Buzdyaksky District